Phiala costipuncta is a moth in the family Eupterotidae. It was described by Gottlieb August Wilhelm Herrich-Schäffer in 1855. It is found in Angola, the Democratic Republic of the Congo, Malawi , Namibia, Sierra Leone, South Africa, Tanzania, the Gambia and Zambia.

References

Moths described in 1855
Eupterotinae